Hugh Torney may refer to:

 Hugh Torney (footballer) (1909–2000), Australian rules footballer
 Hugh Torney (Irish republican) (1954–1996), Irish National Liberation Army (INLA) paramilitary leader